Kiteto District is one of the six districts of the Manyara Region of Tanzania.  It is bordered to the north by the Simanjiro District, to the east by the Tanga Region and to the south and west by the Dodoma Region. The district headquarters are located in Kibaya.

According to the 2002 Tanzania National Census, the population of the Kiteto District was 152,757. According to the 2012 Tanzania National Census, the population of Kiteto District was 244,669.

The District Commissioner of the Kiteto District is Lt. Lepillal Ole Moloiment.

Administrative subdivisions
As of 2012, Kiteto District was administratively divided into 19 wards. Since then, new wards have been created and by 2015 the number of wards was 23.

Wards 2015
The Kiteto District is administratively divided into 23 wards:

 Bwagamoyo
 Dongo
 Dosidosi
 Engusero
 Kibaya
 Kijungu
 Lengatei
 Makame
 Matui
 Ndedo
 Njoro
 Olboloti
 Partimbo
 Songambele
 Sunya
 Loolera
 Magungu
 Chapakazi
 Namelock
 Ndirigishi
 Kaloleni
 Bwawani
 Laiseri

Sources
Kiteto District Homepage for the 2002 Tanzania National Census
Tanzanian Government Directory Database

References

Districts of Manyara Region